The 2014–15 Charleston Southern Buccaneers men's basketball team represented Charleston Southern University during the 2014–15 NCAA Division I men's basketball season. The Buccaneers, led by tenth year head coach Barclay Radebaugh, played their home games at the CSU Field House and were members of the Big South Conference. They finished the season 19–12, 13–5 in Big South play to finish in a tie for the regular season Big South championship. They were upset in the quarterfinals of the Big South tournament by Longwood. As a regular season conference champion, and #1 seed in their conference tournament, who failed to win their conference tournament they received an automatic bid to the National Invitation Tournament where they lost in the first round to Old Dominion.

Roster

Schedule

|-
!colspan=9 style="background:#002649; color:#C5B35B;"| Regular season

|-
!colspan=9 style="background:#002649; color:#C5B35B;"|Big South tournament

|-
!colspan=9 style="background:#002649; color:#C5B35B;"|NIT

References

Charleston Southern Buccaneers men's basketball seasons
Charleston Southern
Charleston Southern Buccaneers men's basketball
Charleston Southern Buccaneers men's basketball
Charleston Southern